Entadella is a genus of air-breathing land snails, terrestrial pulmonate gastropod mollusks in the subfamily Camaeninae of the family Camaenidae.

Species
Species within the genus Entadella include:
 Entadella athrix (Möllendorff, 1901)
 Entadella cavaleriei (Bavay, 1913)
 Entadella concava Páll-Gergely & Hunyadi, 2019
 Entadella entadiformis Páll-Gergely & Hunyadi, 2016
 Entadella kilchomani Páll-Gergely, 2019

References

 Páll-Gergely B., Hunyadi A., Otani J.U. & Asami T. (2016). An impressive new camaenid, Entadella entadiformis gen. & sp. n. from Guangxi, China (Gastropoda: Pulmonata). Journal of Conchology. 42(4): 167-179.

External links
 

Camaenidae